Estación San Javier,  is a railway station of the Empresa de los Ferrocarriles del Estado, located in San Javier, Chile. It is located on José Manuel Balmaceda Ave. at General Barboza.

Estación San Javier is part of the Red Sur EFE, the TerraSur inter-city service has a stop here.

This station is between Ruta 5 and East Downtown San Javier.

In 2001, Estación San Javier began to take passengers.

Lines and trains 
The following lines and trains pass through or terminate at Estación San Javier:

Red Sur EFE
TerraSur inter-city service (Alameda - Estación Chillán)
Expreso Maule inter-city service (Alameda - Estación Linares)

External links 
 Empresa de los Ferrocarriles del Estado

Curico
Buildings and structures in Maule Region
Transport in Maule Region
Railway stations opened in 1874